Autoba latericolor is a small, reddish-grey moth found in Queensland, Australia.

References

Moths of Australia
Boletobiinae
Moths described in 1945
Taxa named by Alfred Jefferis Turner